Caligatus is a genus of moths of the family Euteliidae. The genus was erected by William Wing in 1850.

Species
Caligatus angasii Wing, [1850] Sierra Leone, Liberia, Nigeria, Cameroon, Congo, Zaire, Uganda, Kenya, Malawi, Tanzania, Zambia, Zimbabwe, Mozambique, South Africa
Caligatus dinota (Viette, 1958) Madagascar
Caligatus splendissima (Viette, 1958) Madagascar

References

Euteliinae
Noctuoidea genera